The Mack model EH trucks were a family of 4x2 trucks used by the US and British military before and during World War II. They were built in conventional and cab over engine models, and were used as both trucks and semi-tractors. Originally a commercial design, in 1943 a military version became standard.

History 
From 1937 the US armed forces had bought Mack's commercial E series in small orders, the EH was the largest model. In 1942 large numbers of modified trucks were supplied under Lend-Lease to Britain and many could be seen carrying the L or H-numbers of the British War Department. They differed from the commercial type by lacking chrome trim and nameplates, and were fitted with a military style cargo body with canvas cover. They were painted olive drab all over. 510 EH, 70 EHU, 140 EHT with semi-trailers ST20, 180 EHUT with semi-trailers ST20 were delivered.

In 1943 a military design version of the EH type was destined mainly for Defense Aid. From the total of 3450 EH produced, 2400 were supplied to Britain.

After the war the E series commercial production continued until 1950.

Engine and driveline 
The standard engine was the EN310 (Mack) 6 cylinder L-head petrol engine, a Buda Engine Co. 6DT389 diesel was available. Some transmissions were direct in 4th and overdrive in 5th gear, while others were direct in 5th. The rear axle was a double-reduction full-floating “banjo” type.

Chassis 
The EH had a ladder frame with two beam axles on leaf springs. They were used as fuel servicing trucks in the US Navy or as wreckers for the USMC. Bus chassis had a  wheelbase.

Commercial types had split-rim wheels and hydraulic brakes, military types had disk type wheels and air-brakes. Tires were 9.00x20.

Models 
There were four basic models. The EH was a conventional straight truck chassis, EHT was a conventional semi-tractor. The EHU was a C.O.E. straight truck chassis, and the EHUT was a C.O.E. semi-tractor. A C.O.E. can have a longer body, but the engine is harder to work on.

Besides the cargo and semi-tractor, there were fuel and water tankers, van bodies, wreckers, bus chassis, and fire trucks.

See also
 Mack Trucks
 Mack M123 and M125
 Mack NJU
 Mack NM
 Mack NO
 Mack NR

References

External links

Military trucks of the United States
EH
Vehicles of the United Kingdom
Tractor units
Vehicles introduced in 1936